Shihuiyao Township (Mandarin: 石灰窑回族乡) is a township in Ping'an District, Haidong, Qinghai, China. In 2010, Shihuiyao Township had a total population of 4,849: 2,427 males and 2,377 females: 1,111 aged under 14, 3,311 aged between 15 and 65 and 427 aged over 65.

References 

Township-level divisions of Qinghai
Ping'an District
Ethnic townships of the People's Republic of China